John DeLuca (born in Orange, New Jersey) is an American film producer. He most frequently works with his partner, director Rob Marshall. They met as Off-Broadway performers.

Filmography
 Memoirs of a Geisha (2005, co-producer)
 Tony Bennett: An American Classic (2006, executive)
 Nine (2009)
 Pirates of the Caribbean: On Stranger Tides (2011, executive)
 Into the Woods (2014)
 Mary Poppins Returns (2018)
 The Little Mermaid (2023)

References

American film producers
Living people
People from Orange, New Jersey
Year of birth missing (living people)
LGBT film producers
LGBT people from New Jersey
Gay men